Riddrie is a north-eastern district of Glasgow, Scotland. It lies on the A80 Cumbernauld Road.

Location and amenities
Riddrie is a residential area mainly consisting of 1920s semi-detached houses, originally built as council housing (to a high specification for the time) but now largely privately owned. The former Monkland Canal to the north was filled in the 1960s and is now the M8 motorway. Riddrie is the site of Barlinnie Prison.

There is a Vogue bingo hall, library, bowling green and local shops. Bus services link Riddrie with Glasgow City Centre and Cumbernauld. Nearby is Hogganfield Loch, around which is a public park.

Notable residents
Writer and artist Alasdair Gray grew up in Riddrie and the "Thaw" sections of his novel Lanark loosely document his early life there.

Comedian Rikki Fulton lived in Riddrie as a child.

Prof. David Gemmell McKinlay FRSE (1923–1978) was born in Riddrie.

Scottish international footballer David Marshall grew up in Riddrie.

References

External links

Housing estates in Glasgow
Areas of Glasgow
Garden suburbs